Riichi Sekiyama (関山利一, Sekiyama Riichi, December 23, 1909 – January 15, 1970) was a Japanese professional go player. Born in Hyogo, Riichi became a student of Tamejiro Suzuki in 1924 and turned professional a year later in 1925. He won the first ever Honinbo title in 1941. However, he was unable to defend his title against Utaro Hashimoto in 1943 and was forced to retire due to health problems. He had several pupils, the most notable being Takeo Kajiwara and Yutaka Shiraishi.

Titles and runners-up

References

1909 births
1970 deaths
Japanese Go players
Sportspeople from Hyōgo Prefecture